Cell adhesion molecule-related/down-regulated by oncogenes is a protein that in humans is encoded by the CDON gene.

CDON and BOC are cell surface receptors of the immunoglobulin (Ig)/fibronectin type III (FNIII) repeat family involved in myogenic differentiation. CDON and BOC are coexpressed during development, form complexes with each other in a cis fashion, and are related to each other in their ectodomains, but each has a unique long cytoplasmic tail.

Structure and function 
Cell adhesion molecule-related/down-regulated by oncogenes (CDON) is a conserved transmembrane glycoprotein belonging to a subgroup of the immunoglobulin superfamily of cell adhesion molecules. It is highly expressed in both the somites and dorsal lips of the neural tube of embryonic day 8.5 mice. It is expressed in proliferating and differentiating myoblast cell lines, there is evidence showing its role in mediating the effects of cell–cell interactions between muscle precursors that are critical in myogenesis. It is also expressed in neural crest precursor cells, it regulates the localization of N-cadherin providing a mechanism for directed neural crest migration. CDON protein was shown to bind to all three mammalian isoforms of hedgehog proteins: Sonic Hh, Indian Hh, and Desert Hh.

Clinical significance 

CDON mutations are thought to diminish sonic hedgehog (SHH)-pathway activity which is important in stimulating cell proliferation, differentiation, and tissue patterning at multiple points in animal development. CDON was shown to play a role in differentiation of midbrain dopaminergic neurons through the interference with of Shh signaling pathway. Mutations in CDON gene has been associated with Holoprosencephaly which is structural anomaly of the brain, in which the developing forebrain fails to correctly separate into right and left hemispheres. CDON mutations synergistically interact with prenatal alcohol exposure to increase susceptibility to Holoprosencephaly.

Gene knockdown studies 

CDON knockdown using morpholinos in zebra fish altered the eye development, CDON was shown important in restraining the size of the optic stalk and ventral retina in chick embryos. Additionally, double CDON knock out mice display optic nerve hypoplasia (ONH), a prominent feature of septo-optic dysplasia  (SOD), the same phenotype shown by treating mice prenatally with ethanol. CDON−/− animals also show cardiac dysfunction with increased fibrosis, those cardiac effects are mediated through hyperactivation of WNT/β-catenin signaling.

Interactions 

CDON has been shown to interact with CDH1 and BOC.

References

Further reading

External links